Holosiivskyi District (translit. Holosiivskyi raion) is an urban district of the city of Kyiv, the capital of Ukraine.

Holosiivskyi District was created during changing of administrative divisions of the capital of Ukraine, which was conducted in September 2001, as per the decision of the Kyiv City Council on January 1, 2001.

Holosiivskyi District is located in the southwestern part of Kyiv, bordering  Shevchenkivskyi, Solomianskyi, Pecherskyi, and Darnytskyi districts of Kyiv, and   Bucha, Obukhiv, and Boryspil raions of Kyiv Oblast.

The territory of the raion begins from the famous Khreshchatyk street and stretches toward the southwest of Kyiv. Considering this, the raion is somewhat like the southwest entrance into the city. The raion consists of the following historical neighborhoods of Kyiv: Pankivshchyna, Predslavyno, Yamky, Saperna Slobidka, Baikovo, Zabaikove, Demiivka, Shyrma, Tsymbalov Yar, Dobryi Put, Holosiiv, Feofaniya, Lysa Hora, Bahrynova Hora, Myshelovka, Samburky, Kytaevo, Pyrohiv, Tserkovshchyna, Nyzhnia Telychka, Korchevate, Vyta, Teremky, and Vodnykiv Island.

Gallery

External links
 Holosiivskyi District Administration website 
 Голосіїв in Wiki-Encyclopedia Kyiv 

 
Urban districts of Kyiv